"Pyaar Deewana Hota Hain" (English: "Love Tends To Be Crazy") is a Hindi song from the Indian film Kati Patang (1971). Actor Rajesh Khanna performed in the song. Kishore Kumar sang it under R. D. Burman's tune. It's music is reused from the Bengali song "Aaj Goongoon Goonje", sung by Asha Bhosle in the 1970 film Rajkumari, composed by the same composer.

References

1970 songs
Hindi-language songs
Indian songs
Kishore Kumar songs
Songs with music by R. D. Burman
Songs with lyrics by Anand Bakshi